Stipa capensis, the Mediterranean needle-grass, cape rice grass, Mediterranean steppegrass or twisted-awned speargrass, is an annual grass from family Poaceae.

It is normally found in the Persian Gulf desert ad semi-desert biome. In Persian it is called bahman and is probably the same plant which was used in the Persian festivity of bahmanagān.

References

capensis
Grasses of Asia
Flora of Western Asia
Plants described in 1794
Flora of Malta